Bruno Quaresima (July 2, 1920 – August 26, 1999) was an Italian professional football player. He was born in Vicenza.

1920 births
1999 deaths
Italian footballers
Serie A players
Serie B players
Serie C players
L.R. Vicenza players
U.S. Fiumana players
HNK Rijeka players
Inter Milan players
S.P.A.L. players
A.C. Belluno 1905 players
Association football forwards
A.C.D. Trissino-Valdagno players
Sportspeople from Vicenza
Footballers from Veneto